Sophia Hawthorne (1976 – 17 February 2016) was a New Zealand actress. She was the daughter of actors Elizabeth and Raymond Hawthorne, and sister of actress Emmeline Hawthorne.

In 2004 she starred in The Insider's Guide To Happiness, a New Zealand-produced drama series, and in 2005 she was seen in The Insider's Guide To Love.

She was born in 1976 and died on 17 February 2016 in New Zealand after a long battle with depression.

Filmography

Theatre

References

External links

1976 births
2016 deaths
New Zealand actresses